Aina is a collection of short stories by Ramlal Joshi. The book was published in 2016 by Brother books. This is the second book of the author who had previously published a ghazal collection called Hatkela ma Aakash. The book won the 2016 Madan Puraskar.

Synopsis 
The book is a collection of nineteen short stories reflecting the dark realities of poor people of remote district of Far-Western region of Nepal. The book depicts the various aspects of people living in that region.

Reception 
The book won the prestigious Madan Puraskar for 2073 BS (2016). A cash prize of Rs. 200,000 was provided with the award.

See also 

 Karnali Blues
 Chhapamar ko Chhoro
 Kumari Prashnaharu

References 

Nepalese books
Nepali-language books
Madan Puraskar-winning works
21st-century Nepalese books
Nepalese short story collections
2016 short story collections